Radom Główny, in English Radom Main, is the largest and the most centrally located railway station in Radom, Poland.

History
It was built in 1885 as part of the East–West Iwanogorod – Dąbrowa Górnicza line. The station building was designed by Adolf Schimmelpfennig. The station was named simply Radom until the European railway timetable change on 12 December 2021.

Location
It now stands at the junction of this line and the Warsaw–Kraków line.

Train services
Radom is served by trains of PKP Intercity, Koleje Mazowieckie, and Łódzka Kolej Aglomeracyjna, and is designated as a Category B by PKP.

The station is served by the following service(s):

Intercity services (TLK) Kołobrzeg — Gdynia Główna — Warszawa Wschodnia — Kraków Główny

References 

Station article at kolej.one.pl

External links 
 

Railway stations in Poland opened in 1885
Railway stations in Masovian Voivodeship
Railway stations served by Koleje Mazowieckie
Railway station
Railway stations served by Przewozy Regionalne InterRegio